Varun Singh Bhati (born 13 February 1995) is a para high jumper from India. He was afflicted by poliomyelitis at a young age, and joined sports during his school days. He has won several medals in international events including bronze at 2016 Summer Paralympic Games and 2017 World Para Athletics Championships.

Early life
Since 2014, he has been coached by Satyanarayana, a former national athlete. Bhati is supported by the GoSports Foundation through the Para Champions Programme. He lives in Greater Noida. He currently trains at the Sports Authority of India in Bangalore.

Career
Bhati has T42 disability. He received attention in 2012 when he registered the 'A' qualification mark for the 2012 Summer Paralympic Games in London with a performance of 1.60m. However, owing to limited slots available to India, he failed to qualify for the 2012 Games.

He participated in the 2014 Asian Para Games at Incheon, Korea where he stood 5th. He won a gold medal at the 2014 China Open Athletics Championship the same year. In 2015, he stood 5th again at the 2015 Para World Championship in Doha, Qatar. He recorded a jump of 1.82m at the 2016 IPC Athletics Asia-Oceania Championship where he won a gold as well as set a new Asian record.

Bhati won the bronze medal in the 2016 Summer Paralympic Games at Rio de Janeiro, Brazil when he jumped 1.86m, his personal best. He won the bronze in the 2017 World Para Athletics Championships by clearing a 1.77m jump.

He won a silver medal in the 2018 Asian Para Games, recording a jump of 1.82m.

Awards 

Bhati was awarded the Arjuna Award on 29 August 2018.

He was voted Para-athlete of the Year 2017 at the Times of India Sports Awards.

See also
 Sharad Kumar

References

Living people
Indian male high jumpers
Athletes (track and field) at the 2016 Summer Paralympics
1995 births
Athletes from Uttar Pradesh
Paralympic bronze medalists for India
Recipients of the Arjuna Award
Delhi University alumni
People with polio
Medalists at the 2016 Summer Paralympics
Paralympic medalists in athletics (track and field)
Paralympic athletes of India
Athletes (track and field) at the 2020 Summer Paralympics